Hussein Sirri Pasha (1894–1960) was an Egyptian politician. He served as 25th Prime Minister of Egypt for three short periods, during which he also served as foreign minister.

Early life and education
Hussein Sirri was the son of Ismail Sirri Pasha (1861–1937). He received a degree in civil engineering in Paris.

Career
Sirri Pasha began his career as an engineer at the Ministry of Public Works, and was appointed as minister to the same body in 1937. He was minister of finance from 1939 to 1940. Sirri Pasha first served as prime minister from 1940 until 1942, the height of the Axis and Allied confrontation in Egypt's Western Desert in the Second World War, which concluded with the Second Battle of El Alamein. His cabinet was announced on 18 November 1940, and he formed it without having any affiliation with the political parties.

In February 1941, the Prime Minister of Australia, Robert Menzies, visited Cairo and met with Sirri. Writing in 1967, he said "We found that political problems are the same the wide world over, and laughed about them." He then wrote that "The great pity was that so good a Prime Minister had to serve under so poor a King. Sirri Pasha was... a good administrator, and completely honest."

Sirri next served as prime minister from July 1949 until January 1950. His final term was for three weeks in July 1952, amidst a political crisis which culminated in the Egyptian Revolution of 1952, and the abdication of King Farouk.

Personal life
Sirri Pasha was married to the aunt of Queen Farida, spouse of King Farouk.

References

External links

1894 births
1960 deaths
20th-century prime ministers of Egypt
Finance Ministers of Egypt
Foreign ministers of Egypt
Egyptian pashas
20th-century Egyptian engineers
Egyptian civil engineers
Independent politicians in Egypt
Public works ministers of Egypt